The 2015 Milwaukee Brewers season was the 46th season for the Brewers in Milwaukee, the 18th in the National League, and 47th overall. They finished fourth in the National League Central Division. On May 3 after starting the season 7-18, Ron Roenicke was fired as manager and replaced with Craig Counsell.

Offseason

October 30: Francisco Rodríguez, Mark Reynolds, Lyle Overbay, Tom Gorzelanny, and Zach Duke become free agents.
 Reynolds signed with the St. Louis Cardinals.
 Gorzelanny signed with the Detroit Tigers.
 Duke signed with the Chicago White Sox.

October 31: Claimed Juan Centeno off waivers from the New York Mets.
November 1: Received Adam Lind from the Toronto Blue Jays for Marco Estrada.
November 7: Released Miguel De Los Santos and signed Jeremy Hermida and Pete Orr to minor leagues contracts and invited Orr to spring training.

November 14: Received Kyle Wren from the Atlanta Braves for Zach Quintana and signed Jaye Chapman.
November 18: Signed John Ely to a minor league contract.
November 20: Promoted 4 players from the minors.
November 25: Sent Ariel Pena to the minors and signed Nick Additon to a minor league contract.
November 29: Signed Brent Leach to a minor league contract and invited him to spring training.
December 2-December 17: Signed 4 players to a minor league contract and invited 1 of them to spring training.
December 18: Received Matt Long and Jarrett Martin from the Los Angeles Dodgers for Shawn Zarraga.
December 23: Claimed Shane Peterson off waivers from the Chicago Cubs.
January 5: Signed Nevin Ashley to a minor league contract and invited him to spring training.
January 19: Received Corey Knebel, Luis Sardinas, and Marcos Diplan from the Texas Rangers for Yovani Gallardo and cash. Also sent Hunter Morris to the minors.
January 21: Signed Dontrelle Willis to a minor league contract and invited him to spring training.
January 26: Invited 8 players to spring training.
January 29: Signed Hiram Burgos to a minor league contract.
January 30: Signed Neal Cotts and sent Elian Herrera to the minors.
February 2: Signed Beau Wallace to a minor league contract.
February 5: Signed Chris Perez to a minor league contract and invited him to spring training.

Regular season

Season standings

National League Central

National League Wild Card

Record vs. opponents

Season summary

Game log

|- bgcolor="#ffbbbb"
| 1 || April 6 || Rockies || 0–10 || Kendrick (1–0) || Lohse (0–1) || — || 46,032 || 0–1
|- bgcolor="#ffbbbb"
| 2 || April 7 || Rockies || 2–5 || Lyles (1–0) || Garza (0–1) ||  Hawkins (1) || 30,222 || 0–2
|- bgcolor="#ffbbbb"
| 3 || April 8 || Rockies || 4–5 (10) || Hawkins (1–0) || Rodríguez (0–1) || Axford (1) || 28,720 || 0–3
|- bgcolor="#ffbbbb"
| 4 || April 10 || Pirates || 2–6 || Locke (1–0) || Fiers (0–1) || — || 27,373 || 0–4
|- bgcolor="#bbffbb"
| 5 || April 11 || Pirates || 6–0 || Nelson (1–0) || Worley (0–1) || — || 41,108 || 1–4
|- bgcolor="ffbbbb"
| 6 || April 12 || Pirates || 2–10 || Sadler (1–0) || Lohse (0–2) || — || 39,017 || 1–5
|- bgcolor="#bbffbb"
| 7 || April 13 || @ Cardinals || 5–4 || Garza (1–1) || Wainwright (1–1) || Rodríguez (1) || 47,875 || 2–5
|- bgcolor="#ffbbbb"
| 8 || April 15 || @ Cardinals || 2–4 || Lynn (1–1) || Peralta (0–1) || Rosenthal (3) || 40,826 || 2–6
|- bgcolor="#ffbbbb"
| 9 || April 16 || @ Cardinals || 0–4 || Lackey (1–0) || Fiers (0–2) || — || 40,079 || 2–7
|- bgcolor="#ffbbbb"
| 10 || April 17 || @ Pirates || 3–6 || Worley (1–1) || Nelson (1–1) || Melancon (1) || 25,664 || 2–8
|- bgcolor="#ffbbbb"
| 11 || April 18 || @ Pirates || 2–6 || Locke (2–0) || Lohse (0–3) || — || 33,961 || 2–9
|- bgcolor="#ffbbbb"
| 12 || April 19 || @ Pirates || 2–5 || Cole (2–0) || Garza (1–2) || Melancon (2) || 28,129 || 2–10
|- bgcolor="#ffbbbb"
| 13 || April 20 || Reds || 1–6 || DeSclafani (2–0) || Peralta (0–2) || — || 26,660 || 2–11
|- bgcolor="#ffbbbb"
| 14 || April 21 || Reds || 10–16 || Marquis (1–1) || Fiers (0–3) || — || 27,293 || 2–12
|- bgcolor="#ffbbbb"
| 15 || April 22 || Reds || 1–2 || Cueto (1–2) || Rodríguez (0–2) || Chapman (4) || 30,452 || 2–13
|- bgcolor="#bbffbb"
| 16 || April 23 || Reds || 4–2 || Lohse (1–3) || Gregg (0–2) || Rodríguez (2) || 27,795 || 3–13
|- bgcolor="#ffbbbb"
| 17 || April 24 || Cardinals || 0–3 || Martínez (2–0) || Garza (1–3) || Rosenthal (7) || 26,286 || 3–14
|- bgcolor="#ffbbbb"
| 18 || April 25 || Cardinals || 3–5 || Belisle (1–0) || Peralta (0–3) || Maness (1) || 35,919 || 3–15
|- bgcolor="#bbffbb"
| 19 || April 26 || Cardinals || 6–3 || Blazek (1–0) || Lynn (1–2) || Rodríguez (3) || 32,758 || 4–15
|- bgcolor="#ffbbbb"
| 20 || April 27 || @ Reds || 6–9 || Marquis (2–1) || Nelson (1–2) || — || 17,167 || 4–16
|- bgcolor="#ffbbbb"
| 21 || April 28 || @ Reds || 2–4 || Cueto (2–2) || Lohse (1–4) || Chapman (5) || 19,238 || 4–17
|- bgcolor="#bbffbb"
| 22 || April 29 || @ Reds || 8–3 || Garza (2–3) || Lorenzen (0–1) || — || 23,012 || 5–17

|- bgcolor="#ffbbbb"
| 23 || May 1 || @ Cubs || 0–1 || Lester (1–2) || Peralta (0–4) || Rondón (5) || 31,128 || 5–18
|- bgcolor="#bbffbb"
| 24 || May 2 || @ Cubs || 6–1 || Fiers (1–3) || Arrieta (3–2) || — || 34,878 || 6–18
|- bgcolor="#bbffbb"
| 25 || May 3 || @ Cubs || 5–3 || Smith (1–0) || Strop (0–1) || Rodríguez (4) || 33,398 || 7–18
|- bgcolor="#bbffbb"
| 26 || May 4 || Dodgers || 4–3 || Blazek (2–0) || Hatcher (0–3) || Rodríguez (5) || 23,374 || 8–18
|- bgcolor="#ffbbbb"
| 27 || May 5 || Dodgers || 2–8 || Greinke (5–0) || Garza (2–4) || — || 23,356 || 8–19
|- bgcolor="#bbffbb"
| 28 || May 6 || Dodgers || 6–3 || Peralta (1–4) || Wieland (0–1) || Rodríguez (6) || 22,708 || 9–19
|- bgcolor="#ffbbbb"
| 29 || May 7 || Dodgers || 4–14 || Frías (3–0) || Fiers (1–4) || — || 28,505 || 9–20
|- bgcolor="#ffbbbb"
| 30 || May 8 || Cubs || 6–7 || Hammel (3–1) || Nelson (1–3) || — || 38,283 || 9–21
|- bgcolor="#bbffbb"
| 31 || May 9 || Cubs || 12–4 || Lohse (2–4) || Wood (2–2) || — || 39,600 || 10–21
|- bgcolor="#bbffbb"
| 32 || May 10 || Cubs || 3–2 (11) || Blazek (3–0) || Motte (1–1) || — || 41,467 || 11–21
|- bgcolor="#bbffbb"
| 33 || May 11 || White Sox || 10–7 || Broxton (1–0) || Duke (1–2) || Rodríguez (7) || 29,886 || 12–21
|- bgcolor="#ffbbbb"
| 34 || May 12 || White Sox || 2–4 || Sale (3–1) || Blazek (3–1) || Robertson (6) || 26,935 || 12–22
|- bgcolor="#ffbbbb"
| 35 || May 13 || White Sox || 2–4 || Quintana (2–3) || Nelson (1–4) || Robertson (7) || 29,679 || 12–23
|- bgcolor="#bbffbb"
| 36 || May 15 || @ Mets || 7–0 || Lohse (3–4) || Colón (6–2) || — || 27,554 || 13–23
|- bgcolor="#ffbbbb"
| 37 || May 16 || @ Mets || 1–14 || deGrom (4–4) || Garza (2–5) || — || 30,208 || 13–24
|- bgcolor="#ffbbbb"
| 38 || May 17 || @ Mets || 1–5 || Syndergaard (1–1) || Peralta (1–5) || — || 32,422 || 13–25
|- bgcolor="#bbffbb"
| 39 || May 18 || @ Tigers || 3–2 || Jeffress (1–0) || Lobstein (3–4) || Rodríguez (8) || 26,016 || 14–25
|- bgcolor="#bbffbb"
| 40 || May 19 || @ Tigers || 8–1 || Nelson (2–4) || Sánchez (3–5) || — || 26,994 || 15–25
|- bgcolor="#ffbbbb"
| 41 || May 20 || @ Tigers || 2–5 || Hardy (2–0) || Broxton (1–1) || Soria (13) || 27,716 || 15–26
|- bgcolor="#ffbbbb"
| 42 || May 21 || @ Braves || 1–10 || Teherán (4–1) || Garza (2–6) || — || 18,239 || 15–27
|- bgcolor="#bbffbb"
| 43 || May 22 || @ Braves || 11–0 || Blazek (4–1) || Stults (1–5) || — || 25,774 || 16–27
|- bgcolor="#ffbbbb"
| 44 || May 23 || @ Braves || 2–3 (11) || Avilán (2–0) || Kintzler (0–1) || — || 33,223 || 16–28
|- bgcolor="#ffbbbb"
| 45 || May 24 || @ Braves || 1–2 || Foltynewicz (3–1) || Nelson (2–5) || Grilli (13) || 30,612 || 16–29
|- bgcolor="#ffbbbb"
| 46 || May 25 || Giants || 4–8 || Lincecum (5–2) || Lohse (3–5) || — || 41,969 || 16–30
|- bgcolor="#ffbbbb"
| 47 || May 26 || Giants || 3–6 || Bumgarner (6–2) || Garza (2–7) || Casilla (13) || 35,492 || 16–31
|- bgcolor="#ffbbbb"
| 48 || May 27 || Giants || 1–3 || Vogelsong (4–2) || Fiers (1–5) || Casilla (14) || 35,208 || 16–32
|- bgcolor="#ffbbbb"
| 49 || May 29 || D-backs || 5–7 || Reed (2–2) || Broxton (1–2) || Ziegler (3) || 34,276 || 16–33
|- bgcolor="#ffbbbb"
| 50 || May 30 || D-backs || 3–7 || Hellickson (3–3) || Lohse (3–6) || Delgado (1) || 39,552 || 16–34
|- bgcolor="#bbffbb"
| 51 || May 31 || D-backs || 7–6 (17) || Garza (3–7) || Nuño (0–1) || — || 32,460 || 17–34

|- bgcolor="#bbffbb"
| 52 || June 1 || @ Cardinals || 1–0 || Fiers (2–5) || García (1–2) || Rodríguez (9) || 40,689 || 18–34
|- bgcolor="#ffbbbb"
| 53 || June 2 || @ Cardinals || 0–1 || Lynn (4–4) || Cravy (0–1) || Rosenthal (16) || 42,835 || 18–35
|- bgcolor="#ffbbbb"
| 54 || June 3 || @ Cardinals || 4–7 || Lackey (4–3) || Nelson (2–6) || Rosenthal (17) || 41,567 || 18–36
|- bgcolor="#bbffbb"
| 55 || June 5 || @ Twins || 10–5 || Jeffress (2–0) || Boyer (1–2) || — || 29,398 || 19–36
|- bgcolor="#bbffbb"
| 56 || June 6 || @ Twins || 4–2 || Garza (4–7) || Pressly (3–2) || Rodríguez (10) || 38,707 || 20–36
|- bgcolor="#ffbbbb"
| 57 || June 7 || @ Twins || 0–2 || Pelfrey (5–2) || Fiers (2–6) || Perkins (21) || 31,911 || 20–37
|- bgcolor="#bbffbb"
| 58 || June 8 || @ Pirates || 2–0 || Nelson (3–6) || Burnett (6–2) || Rodríguez (11) || 18,016 || 21–37
|- bgcolor="#bbffbb"
| 59 || June 9 || @ Pirates || 4–1 || Jungmann (1–0) || Liriano (3–5) || Rodríguez (12) || 20,672 || 22–37
|- bgcolor="#ffbbbb"
| 60 || June 10 || @ Pirates || 0–2 || Morton (4–0) || Lohse (3–7) || Melancon (19) || 26,269 || 22–38
|- bgcolor="#bbffbb"
| 61 || June 11 || Nationals || 6–5 || Smith (2–0) || Barrett (3–2) || Rodríguez (13) || 26,371 || 23–38
|- bgcolor="#bbffbb"
| 62 || June 12 || Nationals || 8–4 || Fiers (3–6) || Zimmermann (5–4) || — || 31,815 || 24–38
|- bgcolor="#ffbbbb"
| 63 || June 13 || Nationals || 2–7 || Ross (1–1) || Nelson (3–7) || — || 36,800 || 24–39
|- bgcolor="#ffbbbb"
| 64 || June 14 || Nationals || 0–4 || Scherzer (7–5) || Jungmann (1–1) || — || 34,964 || 24–40
|- bgcolor="#ffbbbb"
| 65 || June 15 || Royals || 5–8 || Vólquez (6–4) || Lohse (3–8) || Davis (8) || 23,007 || 24–41
|- bgcolor="#ffbbbb"
| 66 || June 16 || Royals || 2–7 || Young (6–2) || Garza (4–8) || — || 27,740 || 24–42
|- bgcolor="#ffbbbb"
| 67 || June 17 || @ Royals || 2–10 || Blanton (1–0) || Fiers (3–7) || — || 33,420 || 24–43
|- bgcolor="#ffbbbb"
| 68 || June 18 || @ Royals || 2–3 || Guthrie (5–4) || Nelson (3–8) || Holland (12) || 36,318 || 24–44
|- bgcolor="#bbffbb"
| 69 || June 19 || @ Rockies || 9–5 || Jungmann (2–1) || de la Rosa (4–3) || — || 35,841 || 25–44
|- bgcolor="#ffbbbb"
| 70 || June 20 || @ Rockies || 1–5 || Bettis (3–2) || Lohse (3–9) || — || 35,180 || 25–45
|- bgcolor="#ffbbbb"
| 71 || June 21 || @ Rockies || 4–10 || Rusin (3–2) || Garza (4–9) || — || 41,487 || 25–46
|- bgcolor="#bbffbb"
| 72 || June 23 || Mets || 3–2 || Smith (3–0) || Robles (1–2) || Rodríguez (14) || 25,055 || 26–46
|- bgcolor="#bbffbb"
| 73 || June 24 || Mets || 4–1 || Nelson (4–8) || Colón (9–6) || Rodríguez (15) || 22,017 || 27–46
|- bgcolor="#ffbbbb"
| 74 || June 25 || Mets || 0–2 || deGrom (8–5) || Blazek (4–2) || Familia (20) || 33,354 || 27–47
|- bgcolor="#bbffbb"
| 75 || June 26 || Twins || 10–4 || Lohse (4–9) || May (4–6) || — || 33,296 || 28–47
|- bgcolor="#ffbbbb"
| 76 || June 27 || Twins || 2–5 || Gibson (5–6) || Garza (4–10) || Perkins (24) || 39,977 || 28–48
|- bgcolor="#bbffbb"
| 77 || June 28 || Twins || 5–3 || Smith (4–0) || Fien (2–3) || — || 38,958 || 29–48
|- bgcolor="#bbffbb"
| 78 || June 29 || @ Phillies || 7–4 || Nelson (5–8) || O'Sullivan (1–6) || Rodríguez (16) || 18,423 || 30–48
|- bgcolor="#bbffbb"
| 79 || June 30 || @ Phillies || 4–3 || Cotts (1–0) || Giles (3–2) || Rodríguez (17) || 20,564 || 31–48

|- bgcolor="#bbffbb"
| 80 || July 1 || @ Phillies || 9–5 || Lohse (5–9) || Harang (4–11) || — || 27,069 || 32–48
|- bgcolor="#bbffbb"
| 81 || July 2 || @ Phillies || 8–7 (11) || Blazek (5–2) || García (2–3) || Rodríguez (18) || 30,486 || 33–48
|- bgcolor="#bbffbb"
| 82 || July 3 || @ Reds || 12–1 || Fiers (4–7) || Lorenzen (3–3) || — || 40,760 || 34–48
|- bgcolor="#bbffbb"
| 83 || July 4 || @ Reds || 7–3 || Nelson (6–8) || Smith (0–2) || — || 38,663 || 35–48
|- bgcolor="#bbffbb"
| 84 || July 5 || @ Reds || 6–1 || Jungmann (3–1) || Leake (5–5) || — || 28,881 || 36–48
|- bgcolor="#ffbbbb"
| 85 || July 6 || Braves || 3–5 || Wisler (3–1) || Lohse (5–10) || Grilli (23) || 25,046 || 36–49
|- bgcolor="#ffbbbb"
| 86 || July 7 || Braves || 3–4 || Banuelos (1–0) || Cravy (0–2) || Grilli (24) || 33,388 || 36–50
|- bgcolor="#bbffbb"
| 87 || July 8 || Braves || 6–5 || Jeffress (3–0) || Avilán (2–3) || Rodríguez (19) || 33,338 || 37–50
|- bgcolor="#ffbbbb"
| 88 || July 10 || @ Dodgers || 2–3 || Tsao (1–0) || Nelson (6–9) || Jansen (15) || 44,200 || 37–51
|- bgcolor="#bbffbb"
| 89 || July 11 || @ Dodgers || 7–1 || Jungmann (4–1) || Beachy (0–1) || — || 49,081 || 38–51
|- bgcolor="#ffbbbb"
| 90 || July 12 || @ Dodgers || 3–4 || Báez (2–1) || Smith (4–1) || Jansen (16) || 43,229 || 38–52
|- bgcolor=#bbb
| – || July 14 || 86th All-Star Game || colspan=6 | National League vs. American League (Great American Ball Park, Cincinnati)
|- bgcolor="#bbffbb"
| 91 || July 17 || Pirates || 4–1 || Fiers (5–7) || Morton (6–3) || Rodríguez (20) || 32,363 || 39–52
|- bgcolor="#bbffbb"
| 92 || July 18 || Pirates || 8–5 || Nelson (7–9) || Worley (3–5) || Rodríguez (21) || 33,104 || 40–52
|- bgcolor="#bbffbb"
| 93 || July 19 || Pirates || 6–1 || Jungmann (5–1) || Locke (5–6) || — || 33,835 || 41–52
|- bgcolor="#bbffbb"
| 94 || July 21 || Indians || 8–1 || Garza (5–10) || Salazar (8–5) || — || 34,379 || 42–52
|- bgcolor="#ffbbbb"
| 95 || July 22 || Indians || 5–7 || Adams (1–0) || Lohse (5–11) || Allen (20) || 32,588 || 42–53
|- bgcolor="#ffbbbb"
| 96 || July 23 || @ D-backs || 3–8 || Godley (1–0) || Fiers (5–8) || — || 18,011 || 42–54
|- bgcolor="#bbffbb"
| 97 || July 24 || @ D-backs || 2–1 || Nelson (8–9) || Corbin (1–3) || Rodríguez (22) || 29,956 || 43–54
|- bgcolor="#ffbbbb"
| 98 || July 25 || @ D-backs || 0–2 || De La Rosa (8–5) || Jungmann (5–2) || Ziegler (16) || 34,957 || 43–55
|- bgcolor="#ffbbbb"
| 99 || July 26 || @ D-backs || 0–3 || Hellickson (7–6) || Garza (5–11) || Ziegler (17) || 24,216 || 43–56
|- bgcolor="#ffbbbb"
| 100 || July 27 || @ Giants || 2–4 || Heston (11–5) || Lohse (5–12) || Romo (2) || 41,988 || 43–57
|- bgcolor="#bbffbb"
| 101 || July 28 || @ Giants || 5–2 || Peralta (2–5) || Cain (2–2) || Rodríguez (23) || 42,743 || 44–57
|- bgcolor="#ffbbbb"
| 102 || July 29 || @ Giants || 0–5 || Strickland (1–1) || Fiers (5–9) || — || 42,352 || 44–58
|- bgcolor="#ffbbbb"
| 103 || July 30 || Cubs || 2–5 || Soriano (2–0) || Smith (4–2) || Rondón (14) || 36,206 || 44–59
|- bgcolor="#ffbbbb"
| 104 || July 31 || Cubs || 1–4 || Hammel (6–5) || Jungmann (5–3) || Rondón (15) || 35,669 || 44–60

|- bgcolor="#ffbbbb"
| 105 || August 1 || Cubs || 2–4 || Hendricks (5–5) || Garza (5–12) || Hunter (1) || 41,720 || 44–61
|- bgcolor="#ffbbbb"
| 106 || August 2 || Cubs || 3–4 || Richard (2–0) || Lohse (5–13) || Rondón (16) || 38,536 || 44–62
|- bgcolor="#ffbbbb"
| 107 || August 3 || Padres || 5–13 || Ross (8–8) || Peralta (2–6) || — || 20,888 || 44–63
|- bgcolor="#bbffbb"
| 108 || August 4 || Padres || 4–1 || Nelson (9–9) || Cashner (4–11) || Rodríguez (24) || 23,616 || 45–63
|- bgcolor="#bbffbb"
| 109 || August 5 || Padres || 8–5 || Jungmann (6–3) || Kennedy (6–10) || Rodríguez (25) || 22,975 || 46–63
|- bgcolor="#bbffbb"
| 110 || August 6 || Padres || 10–1 || Garza (6–12) || Despaigne (5–8) || — || 28,789 || 47–63
|- bgcolor="#ffbbbb"
| 111 || August 7 || Cardinals || 0–6 || Lynn (9–6) || Cravy (0–3) || Villanueva (2) || 28,869 || 47–64
|- bgcolor="#ffbbbb"
| 112 || August 8 || Cardinals || 0–3 || García (4–4) || Peralta (2–7) || Rosenthal (33) || 34,327 || 47–65
|- bgcolor="#bbffbb"
| 113 || August 9 || Cardinals || 5–4 || Smith (5–2) || Broxton (1–3) || Rodríguez (26) || 34,993 || 48–65
|- bgcolor="#ffbbbb"
| 114 || August 11 || @ Cubs || 3–6 || Haren (8–7) || Jungmann (6–4) || Russell (1) || 37,109 || 48–66
|- bgcolor="#ffbbbb"
| 115 || August 12 || @ Cubs || 2–3 (10) || Hunter (3–2) || Blazek (5–3) || — || 36,438 || 48–67
|- bgcolor="#ffbbbb"
| 116 || August 13 || @ Cubs || 2–9 || Lester (8–8) || Cravy (0–4) || — || 40,799 || 48–68
|- bgcolor="#bbffbb"
| 117 || August 14 || Phillies || 3–1 || Peralta (3–7) || Morgan (3–4) || Rodríguez (27) || 34,735 || 49–68
|- bgcolor="#bbffbb"
| 118 || August 15 || Phillies || 4–2 || Smith (6–2) || De Fratus (0–2) || Rodríguez (28) || 39,204 || 50–68
|- bgcolor="#bbffbb"
| 119 || August 16 || Phillies || 6–1 || Jungmann (7–4) || Harang (5–14) || Rodríguez (29) || 33,920 || 51–68
|- bgcolor="#ffbbbb"
| 120 || August 17 || Marlins || 2–6 || Nicolino (2–1) || Garza (6–13) || — || 21,910 || 51–69
|- bgcolor="#ffbbbb"
| 121 || August 18 || Marlins || 6–9 || Flores (1–1) || Cravy (0–5) || Ramos (20) || 31,937 || 51–70
|- bgcolor="#bbffbb"
| 122 || August 19 || Marlins || 8–7 || Peralta (4–7) || Koehler (8–11) || Rodríguez (30) || 30,453 || 52–70
|- bgcolor="#bbffbb"
| 123 || August 21 || @ Nationals || 10–3 || Nelson (10–9) || González (9–6) || Lohse (1) || 29,916 || 53–70
|- bgcolor="#ffbbbb"
| 124 || August 22 || @ Nationals || 1–6 || Ross (4–5) || Jungmann (7–5) || — || 33,171 || 53–71
|- bgcolor="#ffbbbb"
| 125 || August 23 || @ Nationals || 5–9 || Zimmermann (10–8) || Garza (6–14) || — || 28,039 || 53–72
|- bgcolor="#ffbbbb"
| 126 || August 25 || @ Indians || 6–11 || Tomlin (2–1) || Peralta (4–8) || — || 11,687 || 53–73
|- bgcolor="#ffbbbb"
| 127 || August 26 || @ Indians || 2–6 || Manship (1–0) || Nelson (10–10) || — || 13,052 || 53–74
|- bgcolor="#bbffbb"
| 128 || August 28 || Reds || 5–0 || Jungmann (8–5) || Iglesias (3–6) || — || 27,632 || 54–74
|- bgcolor="#ffbbbb"
| 129 || August 29 || Reds || 9–12 || Hoover (6–0) || Rodríguez (0–3) || Chapman (25) || 34,365 || 54–75
|- bgcolor="#bbffbb"
| 130 || August 30 || Reds || 4–1 || Peralta (5–8) || Lamb (0–3) || Rodríguez (31) || 33,293 || 55–75

|- bgcolor="#bbffbb"
| 131 || September 1 || Pirates || 7–4 || Nelson (11–10) || Cole (15–8) || Rodríguez (32) || 18,468 || 56–75
|- bgcolor="#bbffbb"
| 132 || September 2 || Pirates || 9–4 || Jeffress (4–0) || Locke (7–9) || — || 24,521 || 57–75
|- bgcolor="#bbffbb"
| 133 || September 3 || Pirates || 5–3 || Jungmann (9–5) || Liriano (9–7) || Rodríguez (33) || 22,424 || 58–75
|- bgcolor="#bbbbbb"
| – || September 4 || @ Reds || 6:10pm ||colspan=6| PPD, RAIN; rescheduled for September 5
|- bgcolor="#bbffbb"
| 134 || September 5 || @ Reds || 8–6 || Jeffress (5–0) || Hoover (7–1) || Rodríguez (34) || 28,632 || 59–75
|- bgcolor="#bbffbb"
| 135 || September 5 || @ Reds || 7–3 || Peña (1–0) || Sampson (2–3) || — || 29,842 || 60–75
|- bgcolor="#ffbbbb"
| 136 || September 6 || @ Reds || 3–6 || Lorenzen (4–8) || Nelson (11–11) || Chapman (28) || 28,027 || 60–76
|- bgcolor="#bbffbb"
| 137 || September 7 || @ Marlins || 9–1 || Davies (1–0) || Nicolino (3–3) || — || 16,804 || 61–76
|- bgcolor="#ffbbbb"
| 138 || September 8 || @ Marlins || 4–6 || Barraclough (2–0) || Jungmann (9–6) || Ramos (24) || 14,958 || 61–77
|- bgcolor="#ffbbbb"
| 139 || September 9 || @ Marlins || 2–5 || Koehler (9–13) || Cravy (0–6) || Ramos (25) || 15,316 || 61–78
|- bgcolor="#bbffbb"
| 140 || September 10 || @ Pirates || 6–4 (13) || Rodríguez (1–3) || Liz (1–4) || Lohse (2) || 21,964 || 62–78
|- bgcolor="#ffbbbb"
| 141 || September 11 || @ Pirates || 3–6 || Morton (9–7) || Nelson (11–12) || Melancon (45) || 28,346 || 62–79
|- bgcolor="#ffbbbb"
| 142 || September 12 || @ Pirates || 2–10 || Locke (8–10) || Davies (1–1) || — || 35,749 || 62–80
|- bgcolor="#ffbbbb"
| 143 || September 13 || @ Pirates || 6–7 (11) || Hughes (3–1) || Thornburg (0–1) || — || 34,740 || 62–81
|- bgcolor="#ffbbbb"
| 144 || September 15 || Cardinals || 1–3 (10) || Siegrist (7–1) || Thornburg (0–2) || Rosenthal (44) || 30,349 || 62–82
|- bgcolor="#ffbbbb"
| 145 || September 16 || Cardinals || 4–5 || García (9–5) || Peralta (5–9) || Rosenthal (45) || 19,827 || 62–83
|- bgcolor="#ffbbbb"
| 146 || September 17 || Cardinals || 3–6 || Lackey (12–9) || Nelson (11–13) || — || 23,734 || 62–84
|- bgcolor="#ffbbbb"
| 147 || September 18 || Reds || 3–5 || Finnegan (4–0) || Davies (1–2) || Chapman (31) || 37,158 || 62–85
|- bgcolor="#ffbbbb"
| 148 || September 19 || Reds || 7–9 || Badenhop (2–4) || Cravy (0–7) || Chapman (32) || 30,387 || 62–86
|- bgcolor="#bbffbb"
| 149 || September 20 || Reds || 8–4 || Peña (2–0) || DeSclafani (9–11) || — || 29,479 || 63–86
|- bgcolor="#ffbbbb"
| 150 || September 21 || @ Cubs || 5–9 || Hammel (9–6) || Peralta (5–10) || — || 34,373 || 63–87
|- bgcolor="#ffbbbb"
| 151 || September 22 || @ Cubs || 0–4 || Arrieta (20–6) || Cravy (0–8) || — || 36,270 || 63–88
|- bgcolor="#bbffbb"
| 152 || September 23 || @ Cubs || 4–1 || Davies (2–2) || Hendricks (7–7) || Rodríguez (35) || 37,559 || 64–88
|- bgcolor="#ffbbbb"
| 153 || September 24 || @ Cardinals || 3–7 || Wacha (17–6) || Jungmann (9–7) || — || 43,243 || 64–89
|- bgcolor="#bbffbb"
| 154 || September 25 || @ Cardinals || 4–3 || Smith (7–2) || Rosenthal (2–3) || Rodríguez (36) || 45,057 || 65–89
|- bgcolor="#ffbbbb"
| 155 || September 26 || @ Cardinals || 1–5 || García (10–5) || Wagner (0–1) || — || 45,561 || 65–90
|- bgcolor="#bbffbb"
| 156 || September 27 || @ Cardinals || 8–4 || Goforth (1–0) || Rosenthal (2–4) || Rodríguez (37) || 45,021 || 66–90
|- bgcolor="#bbffbb"
| 157 || September 29 || @ Padres || 4–3 || López (1–0) || Ross (10–12) || Rodríguez (38) || 36,047 || 67–90
|- bgcolor="#bbffbb"
| 158 || September 30 || @ Padres || 5–0 || Davies (3–2) || Cashner (6–16) || — || 30,514 || 68–90

|- bgcolor="#ffbbbb"
| 159 || October 1 || @ Padres || 1–3 || Kennedy (9–15) || Jungmann (9–8) || Kimbrel (39) || 22,129 || 68–91
|- bgcolor="#ffbbbb"
| 160 || October 2 || Cubs || 1–6 || Arrieta (22–6) || Peña (2–1) || — || 30,044 || 68–92
|- bgcolor="#ffbbbb"
| 161 || October 3 || Cubs || 0–1 || Hendricks (8–7) || Wagner (0–2) || Rondón (30) || 35,291 || 68–93
|- bgcolor="#ffbbbb"
| 162 || October 4 || Cubs || 1–3 || Haren (11–9) || López (1–1) || Wood (4) || 32,959 || 68–94

|

Detailed records

Roster

Statistics
Through October 4, 2015

Batting
Note: G = Games played; AB = At bats; R = Runs scored; H = Hits; 2B = Doubles; 3B = Triples; HR = Home runs; RBI = Runs batted in; BB = Base on balls; SO = Strikeouts; AVG = Batting average; SB = Stolen bases

Pitching
Note: W = Wins; L = Losses; ERA = Earned run average; G = Games pitched; GS = Games started; SV = Saves; IP = Innings pitched; H = Hits allowed; R = Runs allowed; ER = Earned runs allowed; HR = Home runs allowed; BB = Walks allowed; K = Strikeouts

Farm system

The Brewers' farm system consisted of seven minor league affiliates in 2015.

References

External links

2015 Milwaukee Brewers season at Baseball Reference
Milwaukee Brewers season Official Site 

Milwaukee Brewers seasons
Milwaukee Brewers
Milwaukee Brewers season